Mario Enrique Villarroel Lander (born 21 September 1947 in Caracas, Venezuela) is a Venezuelan lawyer.

After studying jurisprudence at the Central University of Venezuela, he graduated as LL. D. in criminology.  He is currently the professor for criminal law at the Universidad Santa María in Caracas and president of the Venezuelan Red Cross Society.  In 1987, he succeeded Enrique de la Mata Gorostizaga as President of the International League of Red Cross and Red Crescent Societies from 1987 to 1997.  During his tenure, in November 1991, it was renamed the International Federation of Red Cross and Red Crescent Societies.  He also functioned occasionally as the president of the Centre for Humanitarian Dialogue in Geneva.

External links 
Red Cross Biography

1947 births
People from Caracas
20th-century Venezuelan lawyers
Living people
Presidents of the International Federation of Red Cross and Red Crescent Societies
Central University of Venezuela alumni
Universidad Santa María (Venezuela) alumni